Athalia is a genus of sawflies belonging to the family Tenthredinidae. Species of the genus Athalia are found in Eurasia, Africa and North America.

Species
The following species are recognised in the genus Athalia:
 
 Athalia abyssinica Forsius, 1930
 Athalia aethiopica Koch, 2006
 Athalia ancilla Serville, 1823
 Athalia armenica Zombori, 1978
 Athalia bicolor Serville, 1823
 Athalia birmanica Benson, 1962
 Athalia cerberus Benson, 1961
 Athalia chevini Lacourt, 1985
 Athalia circularis (Klug, 1815)
 Athalia concors Konow, 1908
 Athalia cordata Serville, 1823
 Athalia cordatoides Priesner, 1928
 Athalia cornubiae Benson, 1931
 Athalia doderoi Zombori, 1979
 Athalia erythraeana Madl, 2018
 Athalia excisa Koch, 2006
 Athalia flavobasalis Koch, 2007
 Athalia fumosa Gribodo, 1879
 Athalia gessi Koch, 2003
 Athalia himantopus (Benson, 1962)
 Athalia incomta Konow, 1908
 Athalia japonica (Klug, 1915)
 Athalia kashmirensis Benson, 1932
 Athalia liberta (Klug, 1815)
 Athalia longifoliae Kontuniemi, 1951
 Athalia lugens (Klug, 1815)
 Athalia marginipennis Enderlein, 1920
 Athalia nigromaculata Cameron, 1902
 Athalia obsoleta Benson, 1962
 Athalia paradoxa Konow, 1886
 Athalia proxima (Klug, 1915)
 Athalia nevadensis Lacourt, 1978
 Athalia rosae (Linnaeus, 1758)
 Athalia rufoscutellata Mocsáry, 1879
 Athalia scioensis Gribodo, 1879
 Athalia scutellariae Cameron, 1880
 Athalia sidamoensis Koch, 2007
 Athalia sjoestedti Konow, 1907
 Athalia taitaensis Koch, 2007
 Athalia truncata Enslin, 1913
 Athalia ustipennis Mocsáry, 1909
 Athalia vetuecclesiae Wappler et al., 2005
 Athalia vollenhoveni Gribodo, 1879
 Athalia wheeleri (Cockerell, 1906)

References

Tenthredinidae
Sawfly genera